The Mitchell Map is a map made by John Mitchell (1711–1768), which was reprinted several times during the second half of the 18th century. The map, formally titled A map of the British and French dominions in North America &c., was used as a primary map source during the Treaty of Paris for defining the boundaries of the newly independent United States. The map remained important for resolving border disputes between the United States and Canada as recently as the 1980s dispute over the Gulf of Maine fisheries. The Mitchell Map is the most comprehensive map of eastern North America made during the colonial era.

John Mitchell's initiation as a map maker
John Mitchell was not a professional geographer or map-maker. Son of a wealthy Virginian family in Lancaster County, on Virginia's Northern Neck, he had been educated at Edinburgh University, Scotland; this education included the first two years of the three-year medical program. Returning to coastal Virginia, he practiced as a physician and studied the local botany. Ill health forced Mitchell and his wife to leave Virginia for London in 1746. There, he served as a consultant on exotic plants to noblemen interested in gardens. Also, it was there that Mitchell would make his famous map. Map historians have understandably been interested in why a physician and botanist who had shown no previous interest in map making should make such a large and detailed map.

Until recently, historians have argued that Mitchell was upset by the lack of interest shown by politicians in London about colonial affairs and so set out to warn them about the dangers posed to the British colonies by the French. Mitchell did so, on his own initiative, by making a first map of North America in 1750, which he then showed to the politicians he knew through his botanical and gardening activities. The map so impressed George Montagu-Dunk, 2nd Earl of Halifax, appointed president of the Board of Trade and Plantations in 1748, that Halifax opened up the official archives and solicited new maps from the colonies for Mitchell to make a new and better map. This was the map published in 1755. That is, the motive force for preparations against the French threat is understood to have come from a colonist who sought to take control of the colonies' future on behalf of the other colonists. (See, for example, the accounts by Ristow and Berkeley & Berkeley.)

A reexamination of the archival evidence indicates, however, that Mitchell made his first map in 1750 at Halifax's behest. Halifax became president of the Board of Trade directly after the conclusion of the War of the Austrian Succession (1744–1748) and its North American component, King George's War. The war had ended in stalemate and a return to the Anglo-French status quo of the 1714 Treaty of Utrecht. In fact, it was a common conviction that it was only a matter of time before another global Anglo-French war would begin, and it was commonly expected that the spark of the new conflict would be the North American colonies. It was then that Halifax latched onto Mitchell as an expert informant on all things colonial; one of his requests, apparently, was for Mitchell to make a new map to show the territorial situation in North America. Certainly, it was only after 1749 that Mitchell's correspondence revealed his new interests in both geography and politics. (See Edney 2008.)

Creation of the map
Mitchell compiled a first map in 1750 from the materials that he could find in London, in official archives and private hands. It proved to be inadequate. Halifax accordingly ordered the governors of the British colonies to send new maps, which most did. These became the basis, when fitted into the overall geographical frame provided by the maps of the French geographer Guillaume Delisle. Late in 1754, Halifax was using one manuscript copy of Mitchell's second map to successfully promote his political position (no compromise with the French) within the British cabinet in the build-up to the Seven Years' War aka French and Indian War. Halifax also permitted Mitchell to have the map published: it appeared in April 1755, engraved by Thomas Kitchin and published by Andrew Millar.

The published map bore the complete title A map of the British and French dominions in North America, with the roads, distances, limits, and extent of the settlements, humbly inscribed to the Right Honourable the Earl of Halifax, and the other Right Honourable the Lords Commissioners for Trade & Plantations,. It bore the copyright date of 13 February 1755, but the map was probably not sold to the public until April or even May. Minor corrections to the map's printing plates were made probably during the printing process (for example, the name and address of the publisher were corrected). A copy of the map owned by King George III of Great Britain is in the British Library's collection. 

The geographer John Green (né Braddock Mead) criticized Mitchell and his map soon after it appeared, emphasizing two failings with respect to Nova Scotia (an area of particular dispute with the French). Mitchell, Green noted, had used neither the astronomical observations for latitude and longitude made by Marquis Joseph Bernard de Chabert in the 1740s nor a 1715 chart of the Nova Scotia coast. In response, Mitchell released a new version of his map, now with two large blocks of text that described all of his data sources; the new version of the map also adjusted the coastline in line with Chabert's work but rejected the 1715 chart as deeply flawed. This version of the map, which Mitchell referred to as the "second edition," is commonly thought to have appeared sometime in 1757, but advertisements in the (London) Public Advertiser and Gazetteer and London Daily Advertiser on 23 April 1756 clearly indicate that this new map appeared at that time.

The map continued to be corrected and some boundaries updated, even after Mitchell's death in 1768, as detailed in Edney (2007).

Map
Mitchell's map was printed in eight sheets; when assembled, it measures 136 cm by 195 cm (4 feet 6 inches by 6 feet 5 inches; height x width). The initial impressions printed in 1755 have a consistent coloring outlining British colonial claims. Mitchell extended the southern colonies across the entire continent, even over established Spanish territory west of the Mississippi. Mitchell divided up the Iroquois territories (as he understood them, reaching from Lake Champlain [Lac Irocoisia] to the Mississippi, and north of Lake Superior) between Virginia and New York, leaving only a much-reduced territory to the French.

Mitchell's map was expensive but it spawned many cheaper variants that trumpeted Halifax and Mitchell's powerful colonial vision to the British public. One of these, published in December 1755 by "a Society of Anti-Gallicans", restricted the French even further just to Quebec.

The map is liberally sprinkled with text describing and explaining various features, especially in regions that were relatively unknown or which were subject to political dispute. Many notes describe the natural resources and potential for settlement of frontier regions. Others describe Indian tribes. Many Indian settlements are shown, along with important Indian trails.

Since Mitchell's main objective was to show the French threat to the British colonies, there is a very strong pro-British bias in the map, especially with regard to the Iroquois. The map makes clear that the Iroquois were not just allies of Britain, but subjects, and that all Iroquois land was therefore British territory. Huge parts of the continent are noted as being British due to Iroquois conquest of one tribe or another. French activity within the Iroquois claimed lands is noted, explicitly or implicitly, as illegal.

In cases where the imperial claims of Britain and France were questionable, Mitchell always takes the British side. Thus many of his notes and boundaries seem like political propaganda today. Some of the claims seem to be outright falsehoods.

The map is very large and the notes are often very small, making it difficult to view online. Reduced scale copies result in unreadable notes. The following list gives a few examples of the kind of notes found on the map, with Mitchell's spelling:

 The region of today's central Tennessee and Kentucky (between the Tennessee and Cumberland Rivers): A Fine Level Fertile Country of great Extent, by Accounts of the Indians and our People
 In the Great Plains: The Nadouessoians are reckoned one of the most Populous Nations of Indians in North America, altho' the number and situation of their Villages are not known nor laid down. (Reference to the Sioux)
 Along the coast of the Gulf of Mexico, present-day Texas: Wandering Savage Indians
 Southwest of Hudson Bay: The long and Barbarous Names lately given to some of these Northern Parts of Canada and the Lakes we have not inserted, as they are of no use, and uncertain Authority.
 North of Lake Huron: MESSESAGUES—Subdued by the Iroquois and now united with them making the 8th Nation in that League. (reference to the Mississaugas)
 Missouri River: Missouri River is reckoned to run Westward to the Mountains of New Mexico, as far as the Ohio does Eastward
 Present-day Iowa: Extensive Meadows full of Buffaloes
 Sandusky, Ohio: Sandoski—Canahogue—The seat of War, the Mart of Trade, & chief Hunting Grounds of the Six Nations, on the Lakes & the Ohio.
 Central Pennsylvania, north of present-day Harrisburg: St. Anthony's Wilderness
 Illinois region: The Antient Eriez were extirpated by the Iroquois upwards of 100 years ago, ever since which time they have been in Possession of L. Erie (reference to the Erie people)
 Along Illinois River and overland to the south end of Lake Michigan: Western Bounds of the Six Nations sold and Surrendered to Great Britain
 Illinois region: The Six Nations have extended their Territories to the River Illinois, ever since the Year 1672, when they subdued, and were incorporated with, the Antient Chaouanons, the Native Proprietors of these Countries, and the River Ohio. Besides which they likewise claim a Right of Conquest over the Illinois, and all the Mississippi as far as they extend. This is confirmed by their own Claims and Possessions in 1742, which include all the Bounds here laid down, and none have ever thought fit to dispute them. (reference to the Illiniwek)
 Just below the previous note: The Ohio Indians are a mixt Tribe of the Several Indians of our Colonies, settled here under the Six Nations, who have always been in Alliance and Subjection to the English. The most numerous of them are the Delaware and Shawnoes, who are Natives of Delaware River. Those about Philadelphia were called Sauwanoos whom we now call Shawanoes, or Shawnoes. The Mohickans and Minquaas were the Antient Inhabitants of Susquehanna R. (reference to the Lenape, Shawnee, and Susquehannock Indians)
 Southeast Missouri area: Mines of Marameg, which gave rise to the famous Mississippi Scheme 1719.
 North Florida: TIMOOQUA—Destroy'd by the Carolinians in 1706 (reference to the Timucua)
 South Georgia: COUNTRY OF THE APALACHEES—Conquered & surrendered to the Carolinians, after two memorable Victories obtain'd over them & the Spaniards in 1702 & 1703 at the Places marked thus [crossed-swords] (reference to the Apalachee)
 Alabama area: The English have Factories & Settlements in all the Towns of the Creek Indians of any note, except Albamas; which was usurped by the French in 1715 but established by the English 28 years before. (reference to the Creek people)
 Yazoo River: River of the Yasous—The Indians on this River were in Alliance with the English, for which they have been destroyed by the French (reference to the Yazoo tribe)

Many geographic features are labeled with names no longer in use or oddly spelled, including:

 Des Moines River: Moingona River
 Kanawha and New River together: Gr. Conhaway called Wood R. or New R.
 Kentucky River: Cuttawa or Catawba R.
 Clinch River: Pelisipi River (a tributary is labeled Clinch's R.)
 Tennessee River: River of the Cherakees, or Hogohegee R. Upstream another label says River Hogohegee or Callamaco
 French Broad River: Agiqua R.
 Little Tennessee River: Tannaſsee or Satico R.
 Hiwassee River: Euphasee
 Ohio River: Ohio or Splawacipiki R.
 Altamaha River: Alatamaha or George R.
 Minnesota River: Ouadebameniſsouté or R. St. Peter (reflecting the Dakota name Watpá Mnísota and the French name Rivière de St. Pierre)
 Muskegon River: Maticon R.

The map also included non-existent features, such as Isle Phelipeaux in Lake Superior, found in earlier maps by Jacques-Nicolas Bellin.

Use at the Treaty of Paris and in the Northwest Ordinance
The Mitchell Map remained the most detailed map of North America available in the later eighteenth century. Various impressions (and also French copies) were used to establish the boundaries of the new United States of America by diplomats at the 1783 Treaty of Paris that ended the American Revolutionary War. The map's inaccuracies subsequently led to a number of border disputes, such as in Maine. Its supposition that the Mississippi River extended north to the 50th parallel (into British territory) resulted in the treaty using it as a landmark for a geographically impossible definition of the border in that region. It was not until 1842, when the Webster-Ashburton Treaty resolved these inconsistencies with fixes such as the one that created Minnesota's Northwest Angle, that the U.S.–Canada border was clearly drawn from Maine to the Oregon Country.

Similarly, during the drafting of the Northwest Ordinance, the map's inaccuracy in depicting where an east–west line drawn through the southernmost point of Lake Michigan would intersect Lake Erie led to a long dispute over the Ohio–Michigan border that culminated in the Toledo War.

References

Osher Map Library: John Mitchell's Map which includes detailed discussions of the use of the map in Paris and the many surviving "red-line maps" and also full transcriptions of the text blocks added to the "second edition".
Library of Congress, Mitchell Map, Second impression of 1st Edition
Mitchell Family Bible, Typed transcript, Virginia Historical Society.

External links

18th-century maps and globes
History of the Thirteen Colonies
Cartographic errors